Eugenius Birch (20 June 1818 – 8 January 1884) was a 19th-century English seaside architect, civil engineer and noted builder of promenade-piers.

Biography
Both Eugenius and his elder brother, John Brannis (born 1813), were born in Gloucester Terrace (later Pitfield Street), Shoreditch, London to architect and surveyor John and his wife, Susanne. He attended schools in Brighton and at Euston Square. Fascinated by engineering from a young age, he would often visit major engineering works being built in north London (such as the Primrose Hill Tunnel). While still a boy he submitted a design for a passenger carriage to the London and Greenwich Railway company. His innovation, to place the wheels beneath the carriage as opposed to the side, thus freeing more room for the passengers was adopted by the railway.

Career
As a result, aged 16 he joined Messrs. Bligh’s engineering works in Limehouse, London as an apprentice, and then studied at the Mechanics' Institute at the request of Dr George Birkbeck. In 1837, aged 19, he received a silver Isis Medal from the Society of Arts for his drawing of a marine steam engine, and the following year a Silver Telford Medal for his drawings and description of Huddert’s rope machinery.

On 19 February 1839, Birch was elected a Graduate of the Institution of Civil Engineers, becoming a Member on 5 May 1863. In 1845 he formed a general design engineering partnership with his brother, John Brannis Birch, which worked across various projects including railways (such as the East Indian Railway from Calcutta to Delhi), viaducts and bridges (including the Kelham and Stockwith bridges).

He also designed the Devon and Somerset Railway, Exmouth docks, Ilfracombe harbour, West Surrey waterworks and Brighton Aquarium, the oldest operational aquarium in the world.

Piers
On his return to England from India, Birch brought his global experiences to bear on the developing English fascination with seaside holidays, specifically the construction of piers. With the railways now allowing easy and cheap access to the seaside, and the known health benefits of clean air, businessmen in coastal towns were competing against each other to create the longest and most ornate piers to attract the greatest number of tourists.

In 1853, a group of Margate businessmen approach Birch to build the first screw-pile pier in Britain. In its design and construction, he brought two innovations: firstly, stylistic innovations directly influenced by his travels, and secondly, the adoption of screw blade added to iron piles making for a deeper and far more resilient base support. The result was a stylish and resilient Margate Pier, which survived storms and two world wars until it was destroyed by a storm in January 1978. The pier's foundations survive to this day, despite direct attempts at demolition.

The Margate pier led to a series of new commissions, which eventually ran to 14 piers in total, the most famous of which is the West Pier, Brighton. On top of this he designed the piled Royal Netley Hospital pier. His effect on pier construction techniques can be measured in the fact that, from 1862 to 1872, 18 new pleasure piers were built, the majority using screw piling. His last pier was at Plymouth, opened in the year he died, 1884.

In the BBC comedy radio series It Sticks Out Half a Mile (a spinoff of Dad's Army), Birch is given as the builder of "Frambourne" pier.

Later life
Later in his life, particularly during his travels, Birch produced numerous watercolour paintings, particularly those of Italy, Egypt and Nubia during a tour taken during the winter of 1874–75.

He died on the 8th January, 1884 and is buried on the west side of Highgate Cemetery (plot no.25915). His grave, which is set back on the left of the main path up from Comfort's Corner, no longer has a headstone or identifiable memorial.

List of piers

References

External links
Bio at structurae.de

People from Shoreditch
Architects from London
English civil engineers
1818 births
1884 deaths
Burials at Highgate Cemetery
19th-century English architects